WEXS (610 AM, "X61") is a radio station broadcasting a contemporary hit radio format. Licensed to Patillas, Puerto Rico, the station serves the Puerto Rico area. The station is currently owned by Garcia-Cruz Radio Corporation, through licensee Community Broadcasting, Inc. and features programming from Red Informativa de PR.

Logos

Translator stations

References

External links

EXS
Radio stations established in 1991
Patillas, Puerto Rico
1991 establishments in Puerto Rico